SZB may refer to:

SZB, the IATA code for Sultan Abdul Aziz Shah Airport, Subang, Selangor, Malaysia
Shenzhen–Zhongshan Bridge, an upcoming bridge connecting Shenzhen with Zhongshan on the Pearl River Delta in China